Marvin Duchow (June 10, 1914 – May 24, 1979) was a Canadian composer, teacher and musicologist who lived and worked in Montreal, Quebec. He was an expert on Renaissance music and the music of eighteenth century France. The McGill University Music Library in Montreal is named after him, as is the Duchow String Quartet.

Early life and education
Duchow was born in Montreal, Quebec. He began studying music theory in 1933 with Claude Champagne at the McGill Conservatory, and took private lessons in composition. After graduating with a Bachelor of Music, from 1937 to 1939 he attended the Curtis Institute, where he studied composition with Rosario Scalero and music criticism with Samuel Chotzinoff. He then attended New York University, while supporting himself by teaching.

Career
Duchow taught music at several schools while completing his education at New York University. He then returned to Montreal, where he taught at the Conservatoire de musique de Montréal and, beginning in 1944, at McGill University. From 1957 to 1963 he was the dean of McGill's Faculty of Music. Among his notable students was composer Alan Belkin.

Duchow composed a number of choral works, beginning in the 1930s.  In the 1950s he was an associate editor of The Canadian Music Journal, to which he contributed scholarly articles.

The Marvin Duchow Memorial Scholarship was established in his name.

Works 
Songs of My Youth, Liedzyklus, 1930
Variations on a Chorale Orchestral, 1936
For a Rose's Sake, 1938
Motet, 1938
Seven Chorale Preludes in Traditional Style Organ (music), 1939
Quartet in C Minor, 1939, 1942
A Carol Choir, 1943
Badinerie for Piano and Orchestra, 1947
Chant intime (Prelude) for Piano, 1947
Sonata for Piano, 1955
Movement for Strings (Largamente), 1972
Three Songs of the Holocaust/ Trois Chants de l'Holocaust Nelly Sachs writing from 1977 is involved in it.

References

1914 births
1979 deaths
Canadian male composers
Musicians from Montreal
20th-century Canadian composers
20th-century Canadian male musicians